Kamal Johnson (born December 9, 1991) is an American football defensive tackle who is currently retired. He played college football at Temple. He is also a member of Groove Phi Groove SFI. He signed as an undrafted free agent with the Miami Dolphins in 2014.

Professional career

Miami Dolphins
After going unselected in the 2014 NFL draft, Johnson signed with the Miami Dolphins on May 12, 2014. On August 30, 2014, he was placed on injured reserve.

Johnson was waived on June 10, 2017.

Washington Redskins
Johnson signed with the practice squad of the Washington Redskins on January 1, 2016. On January 14, 2016, Johnson signed a futures contract with the Washington Redskins. He was released on May 2.

San Diego Chargers
Johnson was signed by the San Diego Chargers. On September 3, 2019, he was released by the Chargers.

References

External links
Career transactions 
Temple Owls bio

Living people
1991 births
American football defensive ends
African-American players of American football
Temple Owls football players
Miami Dolphins players
Washington Redskins players
San Diego Chargers players
Baltimore Brigade players
People from Willingboro Township, New Jersey
Sportspeople from Burlington County, New Jersey
Willingboro High School alumni
Players of American football from Newark, New Jersey
21st-century African-American sportspeople